is a Japanese voice actress and singer. Her most notable role is in Cardcaptor Sakura, providing the voice to Sakura's best friend and cousin, Tomoyo Daidōji. She also voiced lead character Mima Kirigoe in Perfect Blue, Ceres in Ceres, Celestial Legend, and Kikyo in Hunter x Hunter.  In video games, she voiced Pai Chan in Virtua Fighter, Carole Pepper in Honkai Impact 3rd, Mint in Tales of Phantasia and Serika in To Heart.

Filmography

Anime

Film

Overseas dubbing

Video games

Drama CDs

 Boxer Wa Inu Ni Naru series 2: Doctor Wa Inu wo Kau (Mihou)

Discography

Albums

References

External links
  
 
 

1970 births
Living people
Voice actresses from Ōita Prefecture
Japanese video game actresses
Japanese voice actresses
Japanese women pop singers
Japanese idols
Japanese-language singers
Musicians from Ōita Prefecture
Anime singers
20th-century Japanese women singers
20th-century Japanese singers
21st-century Japanese women singers
21st-century Japanese singers